David M. Glantz (born January 11, 1942) is an American military historian known for his books on the Red Army during World War II and as the chief editor of The Journal of Slavic Military Studies.

Born in Port Chester, New York, Glantz received degrees in history from the Virginia Military Institute and the University of North Carolina at Chapel Hill. He is a graduate of the U.S. Army Command and General Staff College, Defense Language Institute, Institute for Russian and Eastern European Studies, and U.S. Army War College.

Glantz had a career of more than 30 years in the U.S. Army, served in the Vietnam War, and retired as a colonel in 1993.

Teaching career
Glantz was a Mark W. Clark visiting professor of History at The Citadel, The Military College of South Carolina.

Activity after retirement
Glantz is known as a military historian of the Soviet role in World War II.

He has argued that the view of the Soviet Union's involvement in the war has been prejudiced in the West, which relies too much on German oral and printed sources without being balanced by a similar examination of Soviet source material. He has been criticized for some of his stylistic choices, such as inventing specific thoughts and feelings of historical figures without reference to documented sources, in a review about his book on Operation Mars.

Awards and honors
2000 Samuel Eliot Morison Prize for lifetime achievement given by the Society for Military History
2020 Pritzker Literature Award for lifetime achievement

Studies for the US Army
 "Soviet Offensive Ground Doctrine Since 1945", Air University Review, March–April 1983 
 1984 Art of War symposium, From the Don to the Dnepr: Soviet Offensive Operations – December 1942 – August 1943, A transcript of Proceedings, Center for Land Warfare, US Army War College, 26–30 March 1984
 1985 Art of War symposium, From the Dnepr to the Vistula: Soviet Offensive Operations – November 1943 – August 1944, A transcript of Proceedings, Center for Land Warfare, US Army War College, 29–3 May 1985
 1986 Art of War symposium, From the Vistula to the Oder: Soviet Offensive Operations – October 1944 – March 1945, A transcript of Proceedings, Center for Land Warfare, US Army War College, 19–23 May 1986
 August Storm: The Soviet Strategic Offensive in Manchuria by David M. Glantz (PDF)
 August Storm: Soviet Tactical and Operational Combat in Manchuria, 1945 by LTC David M. Glantz (PDF)
 The Soviet Airborne Experience by LTC David M. Glantz
 Soviet Defensive Tactics at Kursk, July 1943 by COL David M. Glantz

Books
 
 
 
 
 
 The History of Soviet Airborne Forces (1994) 
 Soviet Documents on the Use of War Experience: The Winter Campaign, 1941–1942 (Cass Series on the Soviet Study of War, 2), David M. Glantz (Editor), Harold S. Orenstein (Editor)
 When Titans Clashed: How the Red Army Stopped Hitler (1995) 
 The Initial Period of War on the Eastern Front, 22 June – August 1941: Proceedings of the Fourth Art of War Symposium, Garmisch, October 1987 (Cass Series on Soviet Military Experience, 2), edited by Colonel David M. Glantz, Routledge (1997) 
 Stumbling Colossus: The Red Army on the Eve of World War (1998) 
 Kharkov 1942: Anatomy of a Military Disaster (1998) 
 Reviewed by John Erickson in The Journal of Military History, Vol. 63, No. 2 (April 1999), pp. 482–483, .
 Zhukov's Greatest Defeat: The Red Army's Epic Disaster in Operation Mars, 1942 (1999) 
 Foreword to Forging Stalin's Army: Marshal Tukhachevsky and the Politics of Military Innovation by Sally Stoecker
 The Battle of Kursk (1999) 
 Barbarossa: Hitler's Invasion of Russia 1941 (2001) 
 Captured Soviet Generals: The Fate of Soviet Generals Captured by the Germans, 1941–1945, Aleksander A. Maslov, edited and translated by David M. Glantz and Harold S. Orenstein, Routledge; first edition (2001), 
 The Siege of Leningrad, 1941–1944: 900 Days of Terror (2001) 
 Belorussia 1944: The Soviet General Staff Study, Soviet Union Raboche-Krestianskaia Krasnaia Armiia Generalnyi Shtab, Glantz, David M. (Editor), Orenstein, Harold S. (Editor), Frank Cass & Co, 2001 
 The Battle for Leningrad, 1941–1944 (2002) 
 Before Stalingrad: Barbarossa, Hitler's Invasion of Russia 1941 (Battles & Campaigns), Tempus, 2003 
 Battle for the Ukraine: The Korsun'-Shevchenkovskii Operation (Soviet (Russian) Study of War), Frank Cass Publishers, 2003 
 The Soviet Strategic Offensive in Manchuria, 1945: August Storm (2003) 
 Atlas and Operational Summary: The Border Battles, 22 June–1 July 1941; daily situation maps prepared by Michael Avanzini, Publisher: David Glantz, 2003
 Hitler and His Generals: Military Conferences 1942–1945: The First Complete Stenographic Record of the Military Situation Conferences, from Stalingrad to Berlin, Helmut Heiber and David M. Glantz editors (English edition), Enigma Books; (2005) 
 Colossus Reborn: The Red Army at War, 1941–1943 (2005) 
 Companion to Colossus Reborn: Key Documents and Statistics (2005) 
 Red Storm Over the Balkans: The Failed Soviet Invasion of Romania, Spring 1944 (2006) 
 Stalingrad: How the Red Army Survived the German Onslaught, Casemate Publishers and Book Distributors, Jones, Michael K. (Author), Glantz, David M. (Foreword) 2007 
 To the Gates of Stalingrad: Soviet-German Combat Operations, April–August 1942 (The Stalingrad Trilogy, Volume 1) (Modern War Studies) with Jonathan M. House, University Press of Kansas, 2009
 Armageddon in Stalingrad: September–November 1942 (The Stalingrad Trilogy, Volume 2) (Modern War Studies) with Jonathan M. House, University Press of Kansas, 2009
 Endgame at Stalingrad: November 1942 (The Stalingrad Trilogy, Volume 3, Book 1) (Modern War Studies) with Jonathan M. House, University Press of Kansas, 2014
 Endgame at Stalingrad: November 1942 (The Stalingrad Trilogy, Volume 3, Book 2) (Modern War Studies) with Jonathan M. House, University Press of Kansas, 2014
 After Stalingrad: The Red Army's Winter Offensive 1942–1943  
 Barbarossa Derailed: The Battle for Smolensk, 10 July–10 September 1941 Volume 1, Helion & Company, 2010; 
 Barbarossa Derailed: The Battle for Smolensk, 10 July–10 September 1941 Volume 2, Helion & Company, 2012; 
 Barbarossa Derailed: The Battle for Smolensk, 10 July–10 September 1941 Volume 3, Helion & Company, 2014; 
 with Mary E. Glantz. The Battle for Belorussia: The Red Army's Forgotten Campaign of October 1943 – April 1944, University Press of Kansas, 2016; 
 Operation Don's Main Attack: The Soviet Southern Front's Advance on Rostov, January–February 1943, University Press of Kansas, 2018
 Operation Don's Left Wing: The Trans-Caucasus Front's Pursuit of the First Panzer Army, November 1942–February 1943, University Press of Kansas, 2019

See also

 Battle of Kursk
 Eastern Front (World War II)
 Operation Barbarossa
 Red Army
 Russian military deception
 Siege of Leningrad
 Slavistics
 Soviet offensive plans controversy

References

 ISBN.nu searchable book database
 Review of Stumbling Colossus

External links
 Interview with David Glantz
 The Journal of Slavic Military Studies
 Archived contents of Journal of Soviet Military Studies 1988-92
 
 
David M. Glantz Official Website Studies and Atlases on the Soviet/Russian Army in Peace and War

1942 births
Living people
American military historians
American male non-fiction writers
American military writers
United States Army personnel of the Vietnam War
United States Army colonels
University of North Carolina at Chapel Hill alumni
Virginia Military Institute alumni
Historians of World War II
People from Port Chester, New York
Defense Language Institute alumni
United States Army War College alumni
Historians from New York (state)